Babington is an English surname. Notable people with the surname include:

 Anthony Babington (1561–1586), English nobleman responsible for the Babington Plot against Elizabeth I
 Anthony Babington (died 1972) (1877–1972), Northern Ireland politician, barrister and judge
 Benjamin Guy Babington (1794–1866), English physician and epidemiologist
 Cardale Babington (1808–1895), English botanist and archaeologist
 Carlos Babington (born 1949), Argentine footballer, manager and club president
 Charlie Babington (1895–1957), American baseball player
 Churchill Babington (1821–1889), English classical scholar and archaeologist
 Ellen Babington (1877–1956), British Olympic archer in 1908
 Francis Babington (died 1569), English divine and academic administrator
 Gervase Babington (1550–1610), Bishop of Exeter and Worcester 
 Sir James Melville Babington (1854–1936), Boer War commander
 John Tremayne Babington (1891–1979), British Air Marshal
 Kevin Babington (born 1968), Irish equestrian
 Thomas Babington (1758–1837), English philanthropist and politician
 William Babington (disambiguation)

See also
 Babington family
 Constance Babington Smith (1912–2000), British journalist and writer
 Sir Henry Babington Smith (1863–1923), British civil servant
 Thomas Babington Macaulay, 1st Baron Macaulay
 William Babington Maxwell
 Babbington (surname)

English-language surnames